National Payroll Week (NPW) is a national awareness campaign held annually during the week of Labor Day, hosted by the American Payroll Association (APA) in the United States, the Chartered Institute of Payroll Professionals (CIPP) in the UK, and the Canadian Payroll Association in Canada.

Government recognition
In 2007, Shirley Fanning-Lasseter, mayor of Duluth, Georgia, proclaimed September 3 to 7 as “National Payroll Week” in the City of Duluth.

In 2003, Elvy Robichaud, then the Health and Wellness Minister  and Minister Responsible for the Office of Human Resources for the province of New Brunswick, Canada, issued a press release to announce "his support and recognition" of National Payroll Week.

See also 
American Payroll Association

References

External links 
National Payroll Week (United States) website
National Payroll Week (United Kingdom) website
National Payroll Week (Canada) website

Awareness weeks in the United States
Awareness weeks in Canada
Observances in the United Kingdom
Payroll
September observances